The Brihanmumbai Electricity Supply and Transport Undertaking (BEST) is a civic transport and electricity provider public body based in Mumbai, Maharashtra, India. It was originally set up in 1873 as a tramway company called "Bombay Tramway Company Limited". The company set up a captive thermal power station at the Wadi bunder in November 1905 to generate electricity for its trams and positioned it to also supply electricity to the city and re-branded itself to "Bombay Electric Supply & Tramways (BEST)" Company. In 1926, BEST also became an operator of motor buses. In 1947, the BEST became an undertaking of the Municipal Corporation and rebranded itself to "Bombay Electric Supply & Transport (BEST)". In 1995 the organisation was renamed to "Brihanmumbai Electric Supply & Transport (BEST)" alongside Mumbai. It now operates as an autonomous body under the Municipal Corporation.

BEST operates one of India's largest fleets of buses. The bus transport service covers the entire city and also extends its operations outside city limits into neighbouring urban areas. In addition to buses, it also operates a ferry service in the northern reaches of the city. The electricity division of the organisation is also one of the few electricity departments in India to garner an annual gross profit.

History

1865–1873: Early proposals 
The idea of a mass public transport system for Bombay was first put forward in 1865 by an American company, which applied for a licence to operate a horse-drawn tramway system. Although a licence was granted, the project was never realized due to the prevailing economic depression in the city due to the end of the American Civil War, during which Bombay had made vast strides in its economy by supplying cotton and textiles to the world market. On 27 November 1871, a notice in the Times of India newspaper found to be too expensive and the tender was promptly abandoned.

1873–1905: Bombay Tramway Company Limited, introduction of horse-drawn trams
The "Bombay Tramway Company Limited" was formally set up in 1873. After a contract was entered into between the Bombay Tramway Company, the municipality and Stearns and Kitteredge company, the Bombay Presidency enacted "The Bombay Tramways Act, 1874", under which the company was licensed to run a horsecar tramway service in the city. On 9 May 1874, the first horse-drawn tram made its début in the city, plying on the Colaba–Pydhone via Crawford Market, and Bori Bunder to Pydhonie via Kalbadevi routes. The initial fare was three annas (15 paise) , and no tickets were issued. As the service became increasingly popular, the fare was reduced to two annas (10 paise). Later that year, tickets were issued for the first time to curb increasing ticketless travel. Stearns and Kitteredge reportedly had a stable of 900 horses when tram service began.

In 1882 the municipality entered into an agreement with the Eastern Electric Light and Power Company to provide electric lighting in the Crawford Market and on some of the roads. But the company went into liquidation the following year and the market reverted to gas lighting. In 1899, Bombay Tramway Company applied to the municipality, for operation of electrically operated trams. Due to the high investment required, the company suggested that the Bombay Municipal Corporation (BMC) should waive its right to take over the tramways, which was to take place in 1901 according to the Bombay Tramways Act. Instead, the BMC decided to take over the company, but was met with several legal problems. In 1904 the British Electric Traction Company (England) applied for a license to supply electricity to the city. The "Brush Electrical Engineering Company" was its agent. It got "The Bombay Electric License" on 31 July 1905 signed by Bombay Tramways Company, the Bombay Municipality and its agent, the Brush Electrical Company.

1905–1947: Bombay Electric Supply & Tramway Company Limited, introduction of electric trams and buses

In 1905, "Bombay Electric Supply & Tramway Company Limited" (B.E.S.T.) was formed. The B.E.S.T. Company was granted the monopoly for electric supply and the running of an electric tram service in the city. Two years later in 1907, the first electric tram debuted in the city. Later that year, a  steam power generator was commissioned at Wari Bunder. In 1916, the Tata Power group began purchasing power and by 1925, all power generation was outsourced from Tata. The passing years aggravated the problem of rush-hour traffic and to ease the situation, double-decker trams were introduced in September 1920.

Since 1913, the company had been pondering over starting a motorised bus service. The main factor against its introduction was the high accident rate for a similar service in London. After years of debate, the company came to a decision on 10 February 1926, to start a bus service later that year. Bombay saw its first bus run on 15 July 1926 between Afghan Church and Crawford Market. The people of Bombay received the bus with enthusiasm, but it took some time before this means of conveyance really established itself. Despite stiff opposition and protests by taxi drivers, the service ran without a hitch, transporting 600,000 passengers by the end of that year. The following year the number had increased to 3.8 million. For several years, it was looked upon as transport for the upper-middle class. Those were the days when the tram was the poor man's transport; it carried one all the way from the Sassoon Docks to Dadar. The bus fare for the same journey was 25 paise. In response to the pleas made by the Government and the Bombay Municipal Corporation, the company extended its services to the northern part of the city in 1934. The Indian independence movement's call for mass non-violent strikes and general civil disobedience led to regular service disruptions, leading to the company incurring huge losses in 1929. The next year was a particular bad year for the company in the wake of the Great Depression. To remain solvent, the company decided to introduce discounted fares for short routes, and increase its coverage to the northern portions of the city. In 1937, the introduction of double-decker buses proved to be extremely popular.

1947–1995: Bombay Electric Supply & Transport, further expansion
Pursuant to the option given to it under the deed of concession granted to the Bombay Electric Supply and Tramways Co. Ltd, the BMC acquired the assets of the combined undertaking, namely the operation of tramways and distribution of electricity in the city of Bombay as a going concern on 7 August 1947. By mutual agreement, the corporation also took over the operation of the bus services, which was run by the Bombay Electric Supply & Transport Company. Thus, "Bombay Electric Supply & Tramways Company" was renamed "Bombay Electric Supply & Transport".

As the company grew, it increased its fleet from 242 to 582 buses over the next decade. In 1949, it took over the Bandra Bus Company, which used to ply buses in the suburbs. In 1951, the electricity division switched over from direct current (DC) to the more efficient alternating current (AC). The company launched its services in the eastern suburbs in 1955. That year, the Undertaking and private operators went to court with BEST asking for a complete closure of the private companies. The case dragged on for four years before the Supreme Court of India granted the organisation a complete monopoly over bus services in the Greater Bombay area. In 1964, due to high operational costs and poor public support, its long-running tram services were terminated. The company became the first company in the country to issue computerised billing in 1974. In 1994, the company introduced electronic meters in a move to replace the less accurate electric meters.

1995–present: Brihanmumbai Electric Supply & Transport, recent developments
With the renaming of the city from Bombay to Mumbai in 1995, the organization was renamed to "Brihanmumbai Electric Supply & Transport (BEST)". Following a Supreme Court directive, the company gradually phased out old buses and introduced new buses which complied with the Euro III pollution control standards. On 19 November 2004, route SPL-8 travelling from Churchgate to the World Trade Centre had started accepting cashless smart cards for automatic fare collection in BEST buses. BEST currently has over 3000 buses in its fleet and plans to increase the number of buses.

After the 9/11 bombings, BEST had installed an audio-visual surveillance system (CCTV) on each of its buses to monitor suspicious behavior on-board its vehicles but it is no longer done. Almost all buses had two LCD TVs per bus which showed BEST TV but it was discontinued. BEST had introduced A/C Cerita services on certain routes but due to high maintenance it got discontinued.

The A/C bus "AS-4" from Oshiwara Depot to Backbay Depot was the route with the highest revenue for BEST.

A new era for BEST began in 2019 when it revised its fare and increased bus fleet by inducting non-AC and AC buses on wet lease. Passenger numbers which were all-time low started to increase and in 2020 it achieved its passenger numbers which it had in 2012. Since 2019, BEST revenue has also improved, however it is still not in profit.

Organisational structure

The company is headed by a general manager, currently Lokesh Chandra.

The transport department is overseen by a "Deputy General Manager (Traffic Operations)" who is assisted by the "Chief Manager (Traffic)." The 'Chief Manager (Traffic)' oversees the five BEST zones, each headed by a 'Dy. Chief Manager (traffic)'. Each zone consists of 7 to 8 depots, whose operations are overseen by an 'assistant general manager (Traffic Operation)'. A 'Depot Manager' or 'Dy. Depot Manager' heads each depot.

The electricity department is headed by a "Deputy General Manager (Electric Supply)' (DGM (ES))," who is assisted by an "Assistant General Manager (Electric Supply)" (AGM (ES)), and is in charge of planning, new projects, construction, street lighting, computer applications and the generation cell. The "Chief Engineer – Electric Supply" (CEES) is in-charge of material testing and the Standards, Meters and Relays and the Review departments. Two "Chief Engineer – Distribution" (CED) officials manage the two administrative zones.

BEST enjoys a high degree of autonomy under the BMC; the latter approves its yearly budget and permits increases in bus fares when required. A body of 17 municipal corporate officials from the ruling party in the BMC form the BEST committee. The committee, headed by a chairman, keeps a tab on the undertaking's daily operations. The committee has a staggered two-year term.

Transport department

Rolling stock and Depot
BEST uses primarily CNG and a handful of conventional diesel buses. As of January 2021, the BEST has a fleet of approximately 3800 buses. The fleet comprises 200 single-decker diesel buses, 2400 CNG buses, 25 AC hybrid buses, 1000 AC Mini & Midi buses, 100 electric ac & non ac buses and 120 double-decker buses. Please note due to 15 year old scrap policy and continuous new purchases of buses the numbers are varying. The diesel buses are being scrapped and being replaced by new CNG and electric buses. BEST also have goods carrier buses, break-down vans, blue coloured sightseeing and party buses, tree cutting double decker buses and driving school buses which are used to train drivers.
All buses are tagged with a route number and its corresponding destination. They are displayed in the front in Marathi and on the side in English. All buses have GPS devices installed which give real time information about arrival to management as well as passengers. Inside the bus there are LED indicators displaying route and destination as well as upcoming stop name in Marathi and English. The newer wet leased buses have cctv cameras installed but the older buses do not have cctv cameras. 
All unit overhauling, repairing of body damages, tyre cut repairs, plant and equipment installation and repairs, and reclamation activities are carried out in the workshop. There are roughly 4,500 to 5,000 bus stops in Mumbai Metropolitan Region. Some of them are equipped with bus ETA system. The bus stops are of two types, shelter and pole. All bus stops have route numbers which stop and stop name in Marathi and English. They even have a unique code on all stops. Each bus has a unique number and depot code assigned to it. The depot codes are mentioned below.

Mostly all BEST buses are painted in standard original red colour with "BEST" logo in English and Marathi. There are different coloured stripes on these buses to indicated some features and type of fuel the bus uses. The following are the different stripes and its meaning :-

1. Yellow and Green strip- it indicates the bus is run on CNG.

2. Grey strip- it indicates the bus is run on Diesel. (These types are almost scrapped)

3. White strip- these are also run on diesel but are procured under MUTP-II and MUTP-III. (By 2023 these types will be scrapped)

4. Silver strip- it indicates the bus is electric powered.

5. Black, Yellow and Green strip- it indicates that a AC CNG bus is converted into non AC CNG bus. (They were earlier Purple coloured King Long AC buses)

Best has some special livery buses too with BEST logo on it.

1. Full grey coloured "Safety is our Motto" in red or white text livery.

2. Yellow and Black livery to indicate that the bus is hybrid and given by MMRDA.

3. Yellow and Pink livery to indicate ladies special 'Tejaswini' buses.

Until BEST was taken over by the municipality, only the Colaba depot was available for the maintenance of buses and minor repairs. As the fleet grew, more depots were needed. In 1961 the fleet comprised 1045 buses. Six new depots were constructed for their maintenance. The Wadala depot was equipped for the maintenance of 300 buses. At this time it was the largest depot in Asia. After this, the authorities decided that no depot should be called on to look after more than 125 to 150 buses after taking long maintenance times into account. Accordingly, small depots were built at convenient spots in the city and its suburbs. The most recent depot was Kalakilla and Malad. Each depot is a work center that provides bus services effectively every day, carries out preventive maintenance, as well as repairs on buses. Depots carry out maintenance practices such as preventive maintenance, unit replacement, RTO passing, body damage repairs of buses. BEST buses are operated out of the 27 bus depot located in four zones viz. City, Central, Western, and Eastern Suburban zones.

In late 2019, BEST began operating air-conditioned mini-buses and midi-buses that were hired on a wet lease. BEST also plans to increase its fleet size to 6,00 buses by 2022. 

In April 2022, it came up with 100% digital buses with a ‘Tap in and Tap out’ ticketing system, making Mumbai the first city in India to get fully digital buses.

Bus routes
BEST bus routes are spread citywide and to neighboring cities. BEST operates inter-city services to three areas beyond the municipal limits of Mumbai City; i.e., into the limits of the bordering corporations of Navi Mumbai, Thane, and Mira-Bhayandar. BEST supplements suburban rails, metro rail and monorail in the Mumbai region. It is for this reason that BEST always gives priority for feeder routes over other routes. BEST uses CNG, electric and diesel-powered buses for its operation. BEST introduced Air-conditioned buses in 1998.

The majority of BEST buses consist of ordinary routes. Limited bus services that skip minor stops are used on long routes, high-capacity routes, and routes that provide connectivity beyond Mumbai city. The buses have "LTD" appended to the route number. "C" routes are ultra long routes. 5xx LTD numbered buses connect Navi Mumbai with Mumbai. Some buses like A-504, 504 LTD,  and C 53 Exp plies till Navi Mumbai's Raigad district, also called as South Navi Mumbai, thereby connecting the nodes of Kharghar and Kalamboli with Mumbai. Buses numbered 4xx mostly like 496 LTD and 497 LTD serve Mulund and Thane and provide the connection to greater Mumbai and buses numbered 6xx LTD and 7xx LTD serves Mira-Bhayander region like 706 LTD and 720 LTD. Buses number 3xx most likely cater to eastern suburbs. Buses numbered 2xx mostly serve western suburbs. Buses numbered 1xx mostly serve central suburbs. Buses numbered from 1 to 99 mostly serve South Mumbai (SoBo).

As of 2021, the BEST runs approximately 3,800 buses, ferrying 5 million passengers over 443 routes, and has a workforce strength of 38,000, which includes 22,000 bus drivers and conductors.
BEST plans to induct more AC & Non AC buses on wet lease and increase total fleet to 6,000 buses by 2021.

Besides buses, BEST operates a ferry service since 1981 in northern Mumbai, across the Manori Creek. The barges operate at regular intervals across the shallow creek linking Manori to Marve.

The BEST bus service suffered two bombings on 6 December 2002 and 28 July 2003 killing six people. In August 2006, BEST introduced payphone system and CCTVs on its buses as a response to terror attacks on the city's buses and trains.

Bus routes are updated till 20th January 2023.

Mumbai Ordinary Bus Routes 
The following is a list of the bus routes operated by BEST in Mumbai.

Mumbai Air Condition bus routes 
The following is a list of the air conditioned bus routes operated by BEST in Mumbai.

Mumbai Limited Bus Routes 
The following is a list of the limited bus routes operated by BEST in Mumbai.

Mumbai Corridor Bus Routes 
The following is a list of the corridor bus routes operated by BEST in Mumbai.

Special Ring Routes (AC and Non AC) 
The following is a list of the special ring routes operated by BEST in Mumbai. Operated from Monday to Saturday except for Sundays and Public Holidays for BKC routes, rest routes operated everyday. These routes connect railway & metro stations to business & residential areas.

Mumbai Airport bus routes 
The following is a list of the airport bus routes operated by BEST in Mumbai.

On September 9, 2022 BEST announced an advance ticket reservation system for its airport bus service through the Chalo App

Mumbai HOHO bus routes 
The following is a list of the hop in hop off (HOHO) bus route operated by BEST in Mumbai.

Mumbai Premium Bus Routes 
The following is a list of the premium bus routes operated by BEST under banner of Chalo Bus in Mumbai.

Types of bus services

The routes operated by BEST can be broadly classified in the following categories.

 Feeder Routes: These routes feed the railway stations and metro stations either from the residential complexes or business districts.
 East-west connectors: These are the routes, which run east/west, where railways have no role to play and connect the western suburb with the eastern suburb.
 Trunk routes: These routes run south–north through the city and are almost parallel to the railways.
 Loop routes: Normally BEST routes are point to point, but there are some routes in the city which are one way loops.

Sometimes there are ladies special buses which are deployed during peak hours. Boards are fixed on windows of bus reading 'Ladies Special'.
Since 2019, BEST runs special Tejaswini livery buses which are in yellow and pink colour specially for women passenger.

AC standard routes: These are air-conditioned routes across the city.
 AC express routes: These route runs on western and eastern express highways, to provide faster services to the commuters.
 AC standard routes: These are air-conditioned ordinary routes across the city.
 AC feeder routes: These routes feed the railway stations and metro stations either from the residential complexes or business districts.

Since 2019, BEST has introduced conductor-less AC & non-AC buses where passengers have to buy the ticket before boarding the bus or on bus stops. However this is a test project and many passengers as well as staff are not satisfied with this new test project.

Since 2021, BEST has partnered with Chalo app, providing Chalo smart cards and app based ticket booking.

The aforementioned routes are further classified into types depending on the number of stops the bus takes and the type of bus used.

Fares and ticketing

BEST has several options to pay bus fares:

 Single journey (paper ticket issued by the bus conductor and validated by ticket punch)
 Chalo App (digital ticket)
 Chalo Card 
 Daily pass on Chalo App
The fares vary depending on the type. Paper tickets are valid only for single journey. Commuters have the option to buy a daily pass, distance-wise bus pass values and zonal pass. Students are eligible for discounts on monthly and quarterly passes and senior citizens for discounts on weekly, fortnightly, monthly and quarterly passes.

BEST Transport Museum
The BEST Transport Museum is at Anik Bus depot at Wadala. The museum was founded by P D Paranjape, the BEST officer who religiously collected bus tickets, engines, ticket-issuing machines from depots across the city. The museum was set up in 1984 at BEST's Kurla depot and was shifted to Anik depot in 1993. The museum traces the evolution of BEST. It houses mini models of charming old BEST buses and ancient trams. Hand-written placards in Marathi and photographs are on display for the public. Entry to the museum is free.

Electric department

Since 1926, the BEST has been sourcing its power from Tata Power, part of the Tata Group conglomerate. The power cables are laid underground, which reduces pilferage and other losses that plague most other parts of India. The nominal rating of power supplied by BEST is 3-phase, 50 Hz, 220/110 kV. Unlike the transport company, the electricity department services only the Mumbai City area, and not the suburbs. It provides power to 5 million residential and commercial establishments and over 33,000 street lights within the city limits. The electricity department has 6,000 employees. The city has four 110-kV, twenty-two 33-kV and 22-kV substations. BEST has a distribution loss of around 10% (2001), among the lowest in India. In 2006, the RPS (Renewable purchase specification) framework came into force, which has made it mandatory for electricity providers to generate or purchase fixed percentage (6% for FY 2009–10) of their power through renewable sources. To comply with this act, BEST plans to install photovoltaic cells in each of its 25 depots. They also plan to use solar power in gardens and street lighting where the demand is low.

Issues

In the financial year 2004–05, the company earned  15142.2 million from its electricity department, and 839.18 crore from its transport department. Profits from its electricity department totalled  152.82 crore (US$35m), and losses in its transport department totalled  212.86 crore ($48.8m), giving the company a net loss of  62.04 crore ($14.2m). For the financial year 2005–06, BEST is expected to earn  15401.3 million ($352.92m) with a profit of  1408 million ($32.3m) from the electricity department alone. However, its transport department is expected to earn  9486.8 million ($217.39m), with a loss of  1403.0 million ($32.26m). This gives it an estimated net loss of  5 million ($114,575). Newer management techniques, such as retrenching of excess staff (494 till date), and the closure of less patronised routes, have reduced the losses in recent years, from a high of  1.75 billion ($40.1m) in 2001. Daily earnings from its transport system is  20 million ($458,450). It collects  7 million ($160,450) worth of five rupee coins daily,  4.8 million ($110,000) worth of ten and twenty rupee notes, and  6 million ($137,535) worth of fifty rupee notes, through its fare collection system. This has led a unique situation wherein it has accumulated a surplus of short change. In July 2005, the company floated tender inquiries to 54 banks to exchange the loose change, which totalled  46.7 million ($1.07m). However, none of the banks sent in a single bid, some citing that their vaults are full, and others saying it would be unprofitable for low denominations, given security considerations.

Though the BEST is a government-owned company, it does not receive any financial assistance from the BMC, or the state government. BEST also earns revenues by way of advertisements on its buses and bus-stops, and through rent from offices on owned properties. The BEST, being a public utility company, cannot increase electricity and bus fares to maximise its profits. An increase, when effected, is usually carried out to curb losses due to inflation. BMC approval is needed before such an increase goes into effect. Prior 2003 the BEST Understanding was a case Peter paying for Paul means the Electricity Division was in profit and Transport loss, so profit of Electricity was diverted to Transport so break even. The company downstream started after the inception of Electricity Act 2003, in that act it is stated that the profit of Electricity supply cannot be diverted but to be used for same entity. After taking the issue with Maharashtra Electricity Regulatory Commission the company was running by adjusting the profit but after Supreme Court order, it could not adjusted the profit to transport now running in loss.

Culture and awards
BEST has been a quintessential part of life in Mumbai. The red double-decker buses, modelled on the AEC Routemaster buses of London, are one of the defining characteristics of the city. When BEST decided to do away with the double-deckers for operational reasons recently, public protests and sentiment forced it to continue with the service. A move to colour all its buses saffron from red in 1997 also drew in criticism, resulting in the red colour being retained. Bus drivers and conductors have come in for praise in the media for their service during the 2005 Mumbai floods, when they ensured that all the stranded passengers were dropped safely to their respective destinations. A total of 900 buses were damaged.

The organisation has received the following awards for safety and management:
 The prize for the second best production achievement by an urban transport body in the country for the year 1982.
 The second prize for production achievement in Urban Transport during the year 1984.
 A memento for the Administrative Report and Statement of Accounts of the Undertaking for the year 1983–84 awarded by the selection committee nominated by the Institute of Chartered Accountants of India.
 The first place and the Best production achievement award in the category of urban transport for the year 1986–87.
 National Productivity Award for the year 1991–92.
 Award for the best passenger-safety record for the year 1994.
 The award for the Best Passenger-Safety performance in Urban Transport in the whole country instituted by the Association of State Road Transport Undertaking (ASRTU) for the year 1995–96.
 International Road Safety Award for the year 2003.

Future
Among its future plans is the "digitisation project", wherein all underground cables, sub-stations, street lights and bus-stops would be tracked digitally through the geographical information system. It also plans to connect all its electricity meters through a network, so that the readings can be taken remotely, and in realtime, thus obviating the need for monthly manual door-to-door inspection.

See also

 Mumbai Suburban Railway
 Mumbai Metro
 Public transport in Mumbai
 Water transport in Mumbai
 Transport in Maharashtra
 Transport in India
 Maharashtra State Electricity Board
 Maharashtra Electricity Regulatory Commission

References

Notes

 May the Best Man Win; Manu Joseph; Times of India, Mumbai; p. 3; 21 August 2005
 BEST will have to wait to become smart; Ashley D'Mello/Times News Network; p. 3;Times of India; 2 July 2005.
 Short of funds, BEST looks to solar power; Olav Albuquerque; Times of India; p. 3; 8 July 2005.
 Exit clause introduced in BEST-TPC pact; Times News Network; p. 4; Times of India; 7 July 2005.
 BEST to hire buses from private operators; Olav Albuquerque; Times of India; p. 7; 4 June 2005.
 You could now approach BEST for some loose change; Olav Albuquerque/TNN; Times of India; p. 3; 2005-07-06.

External links

 
 
 BEST Undertaking  – Official site of the BEST.
 
 
 
 
 
 
 
 
 
 
 
 
  
 
 

Bus companies of India
Companies based in Mumbai
Companies established in 1873
Defunct town tramway systems by city
Electric power distribution network operators in India
Energy companies established in 1873
Energy in Maharashtra
Municipal transport agencies of India
Railway companies established in 1873
Tram transport in India
Transport in Mumbai
1873 establishments in India